Blessed Sacrament Cathedral may refer to:
Cathedral of the Most Blessed Sacrament, Roman Catholic Archdiocese of Detroit
Cathedral of the Blessed Sacrament, Roman Catholic Diocese of Greensburg